William Somers Mailliard (June 10, 1917 – June 10, 1992) was an American banker and World War II veteran who was member of the U.S. House of Representatives from California from 1953 to 1974.

Early life
William S. Mailliard was born on June 10, 1917 in Belvedere, California. He attended Tamalpais High School in San Rafael, California and the Taft School in Watertown, Connecticut. He graduated with a Bachelor of Arts from Yale University in 1939.

Career
He engaged in the banking business with American Trust Co., San Francisco, Calif., in 1940 and 1941. He served as assistant naval attaché in the United States Embassy in London in 1939 and 1940; with Bureau of Naval Personnel, Washington, D.C., in 1941 and 1942; attended the Naval War College in 1942; was assigned to duty on staff of Seventh Amphibious Force as flag lieutenant and aide to Vice Adm. D.E. Barbey in 1943 and released to inactive duty in March 1946 as a lieutenant commander; Captain, USNR; awarded Silver Star, Legion of Merit, Bronze Star Medal;. promoted to commander in 1950 and to rear admiral in 1965 in the U.S. Navy Reserve.

He resumed his banking career in 1946 and 1947 and was assistant to the director of the California Youth Authority in 1947 and 1948. An unsuccessful Republican candidate for election in 1948 to the 81st Congress and secretary to Gov. Earl Warren 1948–1951. Executive assistant to the director of the California Academy of Sciences in 1951 and 1952 and elected as a Republican to the 83rd and to the ten succeeding Congresses, serving from January 3, 1953, until his resignation on March 5, 1974. He was succeeded by John Burton, the narrow majority winner of a special election to fill his vacated seat. Mailliard is the last Republican to have represented San Francisco and Marin County in Congress.

He was a permanent Representative of the United States to the Organization of American States with the rank of Ambassador, March 7, 1974, to February 1, 1977 and nominated by President Gerald R. Ford and confirmed by the United States Senate on December 10, 1975, to be a member of the Board of Directors of the Inter-American Foundation and was a resident of the community of Belvedere, California, consisting of the eponymous island, along with part of Corinthian Island, in the San Francisco Bay, just offshore from the Tiburon Peninsula. He moved to San Francisco, California, before his death. Mailliard voted in favor of the 1957 Civil Rights Act, the Civil Rights Act of 1960, the Civil Rights Act of 1964, and the Civil Rights Act of 1968. He voted as well for the 24th Amendment to the U.S. Constitution and the Voting Rights Act of 1965.

Personal life
He and his first wife, Elizabeth Whinny, had four of his seven children: William S. Mailliard Jr, Antoinette Mailliard, Henry Ward Mailliard, and Kristina Mailliard. After a divorce, he married Millicent Fox, and had three more children; Julia Mailliard, Josephine Mailliard, and Leigh Mailliard. Millicent died on May 2, 2022, at 93 years old.

Death
Mailliard died in Reston, Virginia on June 10, 1992, his seventy-fifth birthday.

References

External links

Guide to the Mailliard Family Papers at The Bancroft Library

1917 births
1992 deaths
People from Belvedere, California
People from San Francisco
Taft School alumni
Tamalpais High School alumni
Yale University alumni
Naval War College alumni
United States Navy personnel of World War II
American bankers
Permanent Representatives of the United States to the Organization of American States
United States Navy officers
Recipients of the Silver Star
Recipients of the Legion of Merit
20th-century American politicians
Military personnel from California
Republican Party members of the United States House of Representatives from California